Billboard Top Country & Western Records of 1955 is made up of three year-end charts compiled by Billboard magazine ranking the year's top country and western records based on record sales, disc jockey plays, and juke box plays.

Webb Pierce's "In the Jailhouse Now" ranked as the year's No. 1 song on all three charts. His record of "I Don't Care" ranked No. 2 on the disk jockey and juke box charts and No. 3 on the retail chart. In all, Pierce had four records that ranked in the top 10 on at least one of the year-end charts.

Kitty Wells' "Making Believe" ranked No. 2 on the year-end retail chart and No. 3 on the juke box chart. The year's other top hits included: (1) Carl Smith's "Loose Talk" which ranked No. 4 on all three charts; and (2) Porter Wagoner's "A Satisfied Mind" which ranked No. 3 on the disk jockey chart and No. 5 on the other two charts.

See also
List of Billboard number-one country songs of 1955
Billboard year-end top 30 singles of 1955
1955 in country music

References

1955 record charts
Billboard charts
1955 in American music